The pair skating competition of the 2012 Winter Youth Olympics was held at the Olympiahalle in Innsbruck on January 14 (short program) and January 16 (free skating), 2012.

Results

Short program results

Free program results

Overall Results

References 

ISU results

Figure skating at the 2012 Winter Youth Olympics